Masdevallia barlaeana is a species of orchid endemic to Peru.

References

External links 

barlaeana
Endemic orchids of Peru